Truth and Tolerance is a book written by Joseph Cardinal Ratzinger (Pope Benedict XVI).

The book discusses faith, religion, culture, freedom, and truth, with special emphasis on the Christian religion and how it relates to these and if it can continue to make an absolute claim as the true religion.

In the preface, he states that "beyond all particular questions, the real problem lies in the question about truth." He first tries to understand what culture is and how cultures relate to one another. Then he tries to understand man, what he is and how he can become himself. Then, in the end, he deals with the question of whether man is made for the truth and in what way he can put the question of truth.

Reviews
Review by Sarah Donahue for the Acton Institute
Review by Ignatius Insight
Review by Cathy Duff
Review by Paul J. Griffiths in First Things
Is It Arrogant to Say Christ Is the Only Savior? Asks Cardinal Ratzinger

References

Books by Pope Benedict XVI
Books about Christianity
2004 non-fiction books
2004 in Christianity
Ignatius Press books